Black Creek is a stream in Knox and Shelby counties of the U.S. state of Missouri. It is a tributary of the North Fork of the Salt River.

It continues into northwest Shelby County and crosses under Missouri Route 151 at Leonard. It continues passing the community of Kirby and Shelbyville where it turns to the east and under Missouri Route 15. It meanders on to the southeast past Kendall and enters the North Fork one mile north of US Route 36 west of Hunnewell in the southeast corner of Shelby County.

Black Creek was named for the dark water it contained.

See also
List of rivers of Missouri

References

Rivers of Knox County, Missouri
Rivers of Shelby County, Missouri
Rivers of Missouri